The following details notable events from the year 1826 in Norway. Norway is a Nordic unitary constitutional monarchy whose territory comprises the western portion of the Scandinavian Peninsula, Jan Mayen, the Arctic archipelago of Svalbard and the subantarctic Bouvet Island. Key domestic issues include maintaining the country's extensive social safety net with an aging population, and preserving economic competitiveness. See also: Norway

Incumbents
Monarch: Charles III John

Events
 May - The agreement from 1825 between Norway and Russia, making Paatsjoki (Pasvikelva) and Jakobselva border between the two countries, is ratified
 December – The paddle steamer SS Constitutionen, the first steam ship of Norway, arrives. The ship was built in England for the State of Norway.

Arts and literature

Births
2 May – Wincentz Thurmann Ihlen, engineer and industrialist (d. 1892)

Full date unknown
Christen Christensen, military officer and politician (d.1900)
Fritz Trampe Flood, merchant (d.1913)

Deaths

Full date unknown
Jens Erichstrup, politician (b.1775)

See also

References